Christian Fredrik Monsen (27 April 1878 – 31 January 1954) was a Norwegian politician for the Labour Party and the Communist Party.

History 
He was born in Kristiania as a son of Ludvig Monsen (1854–1942) and Josefine Aurora Marcelie Dehn (1852–1942). 

Monsen edited the newspaper  from 1913 to 1916 and was a member of Hamar city council from 1907 to 1945, serving as mayor in 1916–1919. He was elected to the Parliament of Norway from the Market towns of Hedmark and Oppland counties in 1922, and was re-elected on six occasions. He represented the Labour Party, except for the term 1925–1927 when he represented the Communist Party. During his last term, from December 10, 1945 to January 10, 1949, he was the President of the Storting. Already before the 1945 election, when the old Parliament was convened, Monsen was installed in the Presidium as the Labour Party dropped their former member of the presidium Magnus Nilssen.

Monsen headed the Ministry of Defence during the short-lived Hornsrud's Cabinet in 1928 and then during Nygaardsvold's Cabinet. Unusually for a Minister of Defence, Monsen was an antimilitarist and wrote three anti-militarist pamphlets (and ).

References 

1878 births
1954 deaths
Norwegian educators
Norwegian newspaper editors
Mayors of places in Hedmark
Politicians from Hamar
Presidents of the Storting
Members of the Storting
Labour Party (Norway) politicians
Communist Party of Norway politicians
Norwegian male writers
Norwegian sports executives and administrators
20th-century Norwegian politicians
Defence ministers of Norway